Brevard College is a private college in Brevard, North Carolina. The college grants the Bachelor of Arts. Bachelor of Science, and Master of Science degrees.

History

Brevard College was named for Ephraim Brevard, a teacher and one of the local leaders that produced the Mecklenburg Resolves/Mecklenburg Declaration of Independence in 1775. Brevard College traces its origins to three institutions: Weaver College, a two- and four-year school, which was founded in Weaverville, Buncombe County, in 1853 by the "Brothers of Temperance;" Rutherford College, which was founded as the Owl Hollow School in 1853 in Burke County (and gave its name to Rutherford College, North Carolina); and the Brevard Institute, a high school inaugurated in 1895 by Asheville businessman Fitch Taylor and his wife, Sarah.

In 1933, the Western North Carolina Annual Conference decided to merge Weaver and Rutherford Colleges to create a single coeducational Methodist Junior college on the site of the old Brevard Institute. In fall of 1934, Brevard College was established after five Weaver faculty and 30 Weaver students moved to the new location as part of an opening that included 24 faculty and 394 students.

The Brevard College Stone Fence and Gate was erected by the Works Progress Administration in 1936-1937 and listed on the National Register of Historic Places in 1993.

Library

J. A. Jones Library, named after James Addison Jones, serves students at Brevard College and supports community borrowers as well. In addition to its print and digital collections, it provides historical information on Transylvania County, study accommodations for group or individual work in public or private space, classrooms for library instruction, and interlibrary loan privileges.

J. A. Jones Library is a member of the American Library Association, Appalachian College Association, Carolina Consortium, Lyrasis, and North Carolina Independent Colleges and Universities.

Athletics 
The Brevard athletic teams are called the Tornados. The college is a member of the NCAA Division III ranks, primarily competing in the USA South Athletic Conference (USA South) since the 2017–18 academic year. The Tornados previously competed in the South Atlantic Conference (SAC) of the NCAA Division II ranks from 2007–08 to 2016–17; as an NCAA D-II Independent during the 2006–07 school year; and in the Appalachian Athletic Conference (AAC) of the National Association of Intercollegiate Athletics (NAIA) from 2000–01 to 2005–06.

Athletics play a large role in the Brevard College campus life scene and are an important part of the institution's history.

Brevard competes in 20 intercollegiate varsity sports: Men's sports compete in baseball, basketball, cheerleading, cross country, cycling, football, lacrosse, soccer, tennis and track & field; while women's sports include basketball, cheerleading, cross country, cycling, lacrosse, soccer, softball, tennis, track & field and volleyball.

Football
The fall of 2006 saw the college field a football team for the first time since the 1950s.

Disc golf
Disc golf is also a popular leisure activity on campus; Brevard competes in several annual tournaments with other local colleges.

Mountain biking
In the fall of 2009, the Tornados mountain biking team (in only their third season) won their first national championship after improving on a fourth-place finish in 2008 and an eighth-place finish in 2007. The team received their second national championship win in 2010. In 2012 the team won their third national championship.

Notable alumni 
 Alphonce Swai, distance runner
 Kody Kinsley, Secretary, NC Department of Health and Human Services

References

External links 
 
 Official athletics website

 
Private universities and colleges in North Carolina
Universities and colleges affiliated with the United Methodist Church
Educational institutions established in 1934
Universities and colleges accredited by the Southern Association of Colleges and Schools
Education in Transylvania County, North Carolina
Buildings and structures in Transylvania County, North Carolina
1934 establishments in North Carolina
Universities and colleges formed by merger in the United States